The Embassy of Burundi in London is the diplomatic mission of Burundi in the United Kingdom. It is located in Uganda House, next to Admiralty Arch on Trafalgar Square; it shares the building with the High Commission of Uganda. There is no plaque or sign signifying that Uganda House also houses the Burundian embassy, the only sign of this being the flag flying above the building.

Gallery

References

External links
 Burundian Ministry of Foreign Affairs
 Embassy of the Republic of Burundi in the United Kingdom of Great Britain & Northern Ireland

Burundi
Diplomatic missions of Burundi
Trafalgar Square
Grade II listed buildings in the City of Westminster
Burundi–United Kingdom relations